During the 1976 Summer Olympics in Montreal, Quebec, Canada, Cameroon, along with many other African countries, boycotted due to the participation of New Zealand, who still had sporting links with South Africa.

Athletes from Cameroon, Egypt, Morocco and Tunisia competed on 18–20 July before these nations withdrew from the Games.

Results by event

Cycling

Team time trial
 Joseph Kono, Maurice Moutat, Henri Mveh, and Nicolas Owona — did not finish (→ 28th place)

References
Official Olympic Reports

Nations at the 1976 Summer Olympics
1976
1976 in Cameroonian sport